Frederick William IV (15 October 17952 January 1861), the eldest son and successor of Frederick William III of Prussia, reigned as King of Prussia from 7 June 1840 to his death on 2 January 1861. Also referred to as the "romanticist on the throne", he is best remembered for the many buildings he had constructed in Berlin and Potsdam as well as for the completion of the Gothic Cologne Cathedral.

In politics, he was a conservative, who initially pursued a moderate policy of easing press censorship and reconciling with the Catholic population of the kingdom. During the German revolutions of 1848–1849, he at first accommodated the revolutionaries but rejected the title of Emperor of the Germans offered by the Frankfurt Parliament in 1849, believing that Parliament did not have the right to make such an offer. He used military force to crush the revolutionaries throughout the German Confederation. From 1849 onward he converted Prussia into a constitutional monarchy and acquired the port of Wilhelmshaven in the Jade Treaty of 1853.

From 1857 to 1861, he suffered several strokes and was left incapacitated until his death. His brother (and heir-presumptive) Wilhelm served as regent after 1858 and then succeeded him as King.

Early life

Born to Frederick William III by his wife Queen Louise, he was her favourite son. Frederick William was educated by private tutors, many of whom were experienced civil servants, such as Friedrich Ancillon. He also gained military experience by serving in the Prussian Army during the War of Liberation against Napoleon in 1814, although he was an indifferent soldier. He was a draftsman interested in both architecture and landscape gardening and was a patron of several great German artists, including architect Karl Friedrich Schinkel and composer Felix Mendelssohn. In 1823 he married Elisabeth Ludovika of Bavaria. Since she was a Roman Catholic, the preparations for this marriage included difficult negotiations which ended with her conversion to Lutheranism. There were two wedding ceremonies—one in Munich, and another in Berlin. The couple had a very harmonious marriage, but, after a single miscarriage in 1828, it remained childless.

Frederick William was a staunch Romanticist, and his devotion to this movement, which in the German States featured nostalgia for the Middle Ages, was largely responsible for his developing into a conservative at an early age. In 1815, when he was only twenty, the crown prince exerted his influence to structure the proposed new constitution of 1815, which was never actually enacted, in such a way that the landed aristocracy would hold the greatest power. He was firmly against the liberalization of Germany and only aspired to unify its many states within what he viewed as a historically legitimate framework, inspired by the ancient laws and customs of the recently dissolved Holy Roman Empire. Frederick William opposed the idea of a unified German state, believing that Austria was divinely ordained to rule over Germany, and contented himself with the title of "Grand General of the Realm".

Reign

Early reign

Frederick William became King of Prussia on the death of his father in 1840. Through a personal union, he also became the sovereign prince of the Principality of Neuchâtel (1840–1857), today part of Switzerland. In 1842, he gave his father's menagerie at Pfaueninsel to the new Berlin Zoo, which opened its gates in 1844 as the first of its kind in Germany. Other projects during his reign—often involving his close collaboration with the architects—included the Alte Nationalgalerie (Old National Gallery) and the Neues Museum in Berlin, the Orangerieschloss at Potsdam as well as the reconstruction of Schloss Stolzenfels on the Rhine (Prussian since 1815) and Burg Hohenzollern, in the ancestral homelands of the dynasty which became part of Prussia in 1850. He also enlarged and redecorated his father's Erdmannsdorf manor house.

Although a staunch conservative, Frederick William did not seek to be a despot, and so he toned down the reactionary policies pursued by his father, easing press censorship and promising to enact a constitution at some point, but he refused to create an elected legislative assembly, preferring to work with the nobility through "united committees" of the provincial estates. When he finally called a national assembly in 1847, it was not a representative body, but rather a United Diet comprising all the provincial estates, which had the right to levy taxes and take out loans, but no right to meet at regular intervals.

Despite being a devout Calvinist, his Romantic leanings led him to settle the Cologne church conflict by releasing the imprisoned Clemens August von Droste-Vischering, the Archbishop of Cologne. He also patronized further construction of Cologne Cathedral, Cologne having become part of Prussia in 1815. In 1844, he attended the celebrations marking the completion of the cathedral, becoming the first King of Prussia to enter a Roman Catholic house of worship.

In 1842, on advice of Alexander von Humboldt, he founded the separate civil class of the Pour le Merite, the Order Pour le Mérite for Sciences and Arts (Orden Pour le Mérite für Wissenschaften und Künste). Said civil order is still being awarded today.

Revolutions of 1848

When revolution broke out in Prussia in March 1848, part of the larger series of Revolutions of 1848, the king initially moved to repress it with the army, but on 19 March he decided to recall the troops and place himself at the head of the movement. He committed himself to German unification, formed a liberal government, convened a national assembly, and ordered that a constitution be drawn up. Once his position was more secure, however, he quickly had the army reoccupy Berlin and in December dissolved the assembly.

He did, however, remain dedicated to unification for a time, leading the Frankfurt Parliament to offer him the crown of Germany on 3 April 1849, which he refused, purportedly saying that he would not accept a "crown from the gutter" (German: "Krone aus der Gosse"). The King's refusal was rooted in his Romantic aspiration to re-establish the medieval Holy Roman Empire, comprising smaller, semi-sovereign monarchies under the limited authority of a Habsburg emperor. Therefore, Frederick William would only accept the imperial crown after being elected by the German princes, as per the former empire's ancient customs. He expressed this sentiment in a letter to his sister the Empress Alexandra Feodorovna of Russia, in which he said the Frankfurt Parliament had overlooked that "in order to give, you would first of all have to be in possession of something that can be given." In the king's eyes, only a reconstituted College of Electors could possess such authority.

With the failed attempt by the Frankfurt Parliament to include the Habsburgs in a newly unified German Empire, the Parliament turned to Prussia. Seeing Austrian ambivalence towards Prussia taking a more powerful role in German affairs, Frederick William began considering a Prussian-led union. All German states, excluding those of the Habsburgs, would be unified under Hohenzollern authority, and these two polities would be linked in an overarching political framework. Frederick William, therefore, did attempt to establish the Erfurt Union, a union of the German states except for Austria, but abandoned the idea by the Punctation of Olmütz on 29 November 1850, in the face of renewed Austrian and Russian resistance. The German Confederation remained the common government of German Europe.

Later years and death

Rather than returning to bureaucratic rule after dismissing the Prussian National Assembly, Frederick William promulgated a new constitution that created a Parliament of Prussia with two chambers, an aristocratic upper house and an elected lower house. The lower house was elected by all taxpayers, but in a three-tiered system based on the amount of taxes paid, so that true universal suffrage was denied. The constitution also reserved to the king the power of appointing all ministers, re-established the conservative district assemblies and provincial diets, and guaranteed that the civil service and the military remained firmly under control of the king. This was a more liberal system than had existed in Prussia before 1848, but it was still a conservative system of government in which the monarch, the aristocracy, and the military retained most of the power. This constitution remained in effect until the dissolution of the Prussian kingdom in 1918.

Following the revolutions of 1848, the increasingly gloomy king withdrew from the public eye, surrounding himself with advisers who preached absolute orthodoxy and conservatism in religious and political matters. A series of strokes from 14 July 1857 onward left the king partially paralyzed and largely mentally incapacitated, and his brother (and heir-presumptive) William served as regent after 7 October 1858. On 24 November 1859, the king suffered a stroke that left him paralyzed on the left side. He was driven around in a wheelchair from then on. On 4 November 1860, he lost consciousness after another stroke. One more stroke resulted in the king's death at Sanssouci palace on 2 January 1861, at which point the regent acceded to the throne as William I of Prussia.

In accordance with his testamentary instructions from 1854, Frederick William IV is interred with his wife in the crypt underneath the Church of Peace in the park of Sanssouci, at Potsdam, while his heart was removed from his body and buried alongside his parents at the Charlottenburg Palace mausoleum.

Religion
He was a Calvinist member of the Evangelical State Church of Prussia, a United Protestant denomination that brought together Reformed and Lutheran believers.

Honours
German decorations

Foreign decorations

Ancestry

See also
 Equestrian statue of Frederick William IV

Notes

References
 Barclay, David E.,Frederick William IV and the Prussian Monarchy 1840–1862, (Oxford, 1995).
 Clark, Christopher. Iron Kingdom: The Rise and Downfall of Prussia, 1600–1947, by, (Harvard University Press, 2006).
 
 Sheehan, James J. "Frederick William IV and the Prussian Monarchy: 1840-1861." English Historical Review 112.449 (1997): 1312–1314.

External links

 

1795 births
1861 deaths
19th-century Kings of Prussia
People from Berlin
Kings of Prussia
Princes of Neuchâtel
Crown Princes of Prussia
Prussian princes
House of Hohenzollern
German landowners
People of the Revolutions of 1848
Protestant monarchs
Extra Knights Companion of the Garter
German Calvinist and Reformed Christians
Knights of the Golden Fleece of Spain
Recipients of the Order of St. George of the Fourth Degree
Honorary members of the Saint Petersburg Academy of Sciences
Burials at the Charlottenburg Palace Park Mausoleum, Berlin
19th-century German people
19th-century Protestants
Knights Grand Cross of the Military Order of William
Grand Crosses of the Order of Saint Stephen of Hungary
Grand Croix of the Légion d'honneur
Recipients of the Order of the Netherlands Lion
Prussian Army personnel of the Napoleonic Wars
German revolutions of 1848–1849